Trey Keith Darilek (born April 23, 1981 in San Antonio, Texas) is a former American football guard. He was drafted by the Philadelphia Eagles in the fourth round of the 2004 NFL Draft. He played college football at Texas-El Paso.

Darilek has also been a member of the Miami Dolphins, Dallas Cowboys, Edmonton Eskimos and Jacksonville Jaguars.

College career
Darilek played college football at the University of Texas at El Paso, where he started 42 games and was an All-WAC first-team selection as a senior.

Professional career

Philadelphia Eagles
Darilek was a 4th round draft pick by the Philadelphia Eagles in the 2004 NFL Draft and saw limited action in 2004 and 2005.  He was cut by the Eagles before the 2006 season.

Dallas Cowboys
Darilek was later signed by the Dallas Cowboys and played in their preseason games until he was cut along with many other Cowboys players in late August 2007.

Miami Dolphins
Darilek also played for the Miami Dolphins during the 2008 preseason but was released afterwards as part of the roster cutdown requirements.

Edmonton Eskimos
Trey was signed by the Edmonton Eskimos of the Canadian Football League as a free agent on September 11. He played five games at center for the team.

External links
Jacksonville Jaguars bio

1981 births
Living people
Players of American football from San Antonio
Players of Canadian football from San Antonio
American football offensive tackles
American football offensive guards
American football centers
American players of Canadian football
Canadian football offensive linemen
UTEP Miners football players
Philadelphia Eagles players
Miami Dolphins players
Dallas Cowboys players
Edmonton Elks players
Jacksonville Jaguars players